The Way Too Cool 50K Endurance Run is an annual ultramarathon run in the Sierra Nevada, that starts and ends in the town of Cool.

The race takes place in early March, and was first held in 1990.

Course
Most of the course is held on single-track trails and fire roads. The race course follows sections of the Western States Trail Ride route, in the Sierra Nevada within El Dorado County and Placer County.

Participation
Registration opens in the beginning of December and runners are selected by lottery.

The race has a high completion rate greater than 95%.

References

External links
Way Too Cool 50K webpage
Way Too Cool 50K homepage

Ultramarathons in California
Tourist attractions in El Dorado County, California
Tourist attractions in Placer County, California
Recurring sporting events established in 1990
1990 establishments in California